Doug Martin (born December 8, 1966) is an American professional golfer.

Martin was born in Bluffton, Ohio. As an amateur, he won the 1984 U.S. Junior Amateur, was semi-finalist at 1988 U.S. Amateur, and played on the 1989 Walker Cup team. He played college golf at University of Oklahoma where he won three events and was a three-time All-American. He graduated and turned professional in 1989.

Martin played on the Nationwide Tour and PGA Tour from 1991 to 1999. On the Nationwide Tour (1991, 1993), he won the 1993 Nike South Texas Open. On the PGA Tour (1992, 1994–99), his best finish was a playoff loss to Vijay Singh at the 1995 Buick Classic.

Martin has been the head coach of the Cincinnati Bearcats men's golf team since the fall of 2007.

Amateur wins
1984 U.S. Junior Amateur

Professional wins (2)

Nike Tour wins (1)

Nike Tour playoff record (1–1)

Other wins (1)
1989 Oklahoma Open

Playoff record
PGA Tour playoff record (0–1)

Results in major championships

CUT = missed the half-way cut
"T" = Tied
Note: Martin never played in the Masters Tournament or The Open Championship.

U.S. national team appearances
Amateur
Walker Cup: 1989

See also
1991 PGA Tour Qualifying School graduates
1993 Nike Tour graduates
1994 PGA Tour Qualifying School graduates

References

External links

Cincinnati Bearcats profile

American male golfers
Oklahoma Sooners men's golfers
PGA Tour golfers
Cincinnati Bearcats men's golf coaches
Korn Ferry Tour graduates
Golfers from Ohio
People from Bluffton, Ohio
1966 births
Living people